Theta Chi fraternity has chartered 245 chapters, of which 158 are active. Its first 24 chapters were given single Greek letter designations (Α, Β, etc.), and all following chapters were given double Greek letter designations (ΑΒ, ΑΓ, etc.) such that no letter be used twice (no ΑΑ, ΒΒ, etc.). The ΘΧ Chapter of Theta Chi Fraternity designation is an honorary chapter, whose members are people not previously initiated into the Fraternity, but who have served the Fraternity.

Single Letter Chapters

Α Series Chapters

Β Series Chapters

Γ Series Chapters

Δ Series Chapters

Ε Series Chapters

Ζ Series Chapters

Η Series Chapters

Θ Series Chapters

Ι Series Chapters

K Series Chapters

Colonies

References

Lists of chapters of United States student societies by society
chapters